Anne Charnock (born 8 June 1954) is a British author of science fiction novels. In 2018, she won the Arthur C. Clarke Award in science fiction, for her novel Dreams Before the Start of Time.

Career 
Born at Bolton, England, Charnock has a background in environmental science, journalism, and fine art, which she incorporates into her science fiction writing. She has worked as a science writer for The Guardian and New Scientist, and as a foreign correspondent.

Charnock's first novel, A Calculated Life, was originally self-published in 2013, and was later picked up by 47 North, an imprint of Amazon. The story follows migrant workers attempting to make a living in the UK, and is one of a quartet of short stories published by NewCon along with stories by Neil Williamson, Simon Morden and Alastair Reynolds. It was nominated for the 2013 Philip K. Dick Award.

Charnock is also the author of Sleeping Embers of an Ordinary Mind (47 North), published in 2015, the story of an Italian female artist in the 15th century.

Her 2017 novel Dreams Before the Start of Time (47 North), is set in a future world where artificial wombs have become the primary method of reproduction and infertility has been eradicated. It won the Arthur C. Clarke award for science fiction in 2018. In 2017, it was shortlisted for the British Science Fiction Association (BSFA) Award for Best Novel.

In 2017, Charnock won the BSFA Award for Best Shorter Fiction for her novella The Enclave, published by NewCon. Charnock was a judge during the 2018 James White Award short story competition.

Bibliography

Novels 

 A Calculated Life (2013). Self-published. 
 Sleeping Embers of an Ordinary Mind (2015). 
 Dreams Before the Start of Time (2017).

Chapbook 

 The Enclave (2017)

Short stories

Awards

External links 

 Official website

References 

1954 births
Living people 
Writers from Bolton
British science fiction writers
British science writers
Women science fiction and fantasy writers
Women science writers